Hui Xian REIT is a real estate investment trust demerged from Cheung Kong Holdings. It is the first product listed on the Hong Kong Stock Exchange denominated in yuan.

In 2012, Hui Xian REIT had the second highest market capitalization among REITs in Hong Kong. As of 2019, its portfolio included shopping malls, office buildings, serviced apartments, and hotels.

References

Real estate investment trusts of Hong Kong
Companies listed on the Hong Kong Stock Exchange